Chondria elegans is a species of beetle in the genus Chondria, which is found in  Malaysia.

References

External links

Endomychidae
Beetles described in 1979
Insects of Malaysia